T. Cleon Lacefield is Lockheed Martin vice president and Orion program manager.

With his Lockheed Martin team in Denver and Houston, he won the CEV / Orion development contract from NASA in September 2006.

Career
He was NASA Space Shuttle flight director in the 1980s and Lockheed Martin Skunk Works X-33 program manager in the 1990s.

References 

Living people
Year of birth missing (living people)